Anthony Griffith is an American actor and comedian. He was born to a religious family in Chicago, Illinois, where he lived until he went to college in the 1980s. While in college he took up stand up comedy.

While performing through the Los Angeles comedy club circuit, he was asked to perform for The Tonight Show Starring Johnny Carson a number of times. At the same time, his 2-year-old daughter's cancer had returned, eventually claiming her life, as tearfully recounted by Griffith in a deeply emotional episode of The Moth.

As an actor, he has had a number of roles, such as “Tales from the Hood”, Mario Van Peebles' “Panther”, “The Curve” and the television drama “Our Father”, as well as a number of others. He received an Emmy for his performance in "Our Father".

He resides in Los Angeles, California.

He suffers from MS.

References

American male comedians
American male television actors
Male actors from Chicago
Living people
Comedians from Illinois
Year of birth missing (living people)
20th-century American comedians
20th-century American male actors
21st-century American comedians
21st-century American male actors
People with multiple sclerosis